James Michael Rossignol (born July 1978) is a British video game journalist and critic, as well as an author. He has also branched out into games, founding the company Big Robot in 2010.

Biography 
Rossignol started his career as a reporter on a finance newsletter. He says he was fired from the job due to obsession with a video game. He formerly wrote for the PC gaming blog Rock Paper Shotgun.

Rossignol has written a book entitled This Gaming Life: Travels in Three Cities, published by the University of Michigan imprint DigitalCultureBooks. The book examines the relationship between gamers and the videogames they play, via a tour through differing aspects of gaming culture in several parts of the world.

Rossignol lives with his fiancée Amanda Ricaud and their two children in Bath, Somerset.

References

External links 

Interview with Jim Rossignol on BLDGBLOG

1978 births
British male journalists
British video game designers
Living people
Video game critics